Coriander (Coriandrum sativum) is a cultivated plant native to Europe and used as a culinary herb.

Coriander may also refer to:

Plants
 Eryngium foetidum, a Central and South American herb, also cultivated in Asia, and sometimes called Mexican coriander or long coriander
 Persicaria odorata, an Asian herb sometimes called Vietnamese coriander
 Porophyllum ruderale, a South American herb sometimes called Bolivian coriander

Other uses
 Coriander, the name of a character in the PS2 game Steambot Chronicles
 Coriander, the release name of the latest version of Netvibes
 Koriand'r,  the name of the DC Comics superheroine known as Starfire
 Coriander Widetrack, a character in the movie Cars

See also
Coreander